Harold Herman Greene (born Heinz Grünhaus, February 6, 1923 – January 29, 2000) was a United States district judge of the United States District Court for the District of Columbia.

Education and career

Greene was born Heinz Grünhaus in Frankfurt, Germany. In 1939 his family, who were Jewish, fled the Nazi regime to Belgium, Vichy France, Portugal, and finally the United States in 1943, during World War II. Greene enlisted in the United States Army and interrogated German prisoners for military intelligence. He received his Bachelor of Arts degree in 1949 from George Washington University and Juris Doctor in 1952 from George Washington University Law School. From 1952 to 1953, Greene was a law clerk for Judge Bennett Champ Clark of the United States Court of Appeals for the District of Columbia Circuit. Next, Greene was an Assistant United States Attorney for the District of Columbia until 1957 and chief of appeals research for the United States Department of Justice Civil Rights Division from 1957 to 1965. At the Justice Department, Greene helped create the Civil Rights Act of 1964 and Voting Rights Act of 1965. Greene was a judge of the Court of General Sessions in Washington, D.C. from 1956 to 1966 and Chief Judge of that court until 1971, and Chief Judge of the Superior Court of the District of Columbia from 1971 to 1978.

Federal judicial service

Greene was nominated by President Jimmy Carter on March 22, 1978, to a seat on the United States District Court for the District of Columbia vacated by Judge John Sirica. He was confirmed by the United States Senate on May 17, 1978, and received his commission on May 19, 1978. He assumed senior status on August 6, 1995. His service was terminated on January 29, 2000, due to his death in Washington, D.C.

Notable cases

Judge Greene presided over United States v. AT&T, the antitrust suit that broke up the AT&T vertical market monopoly on the telecommunications industry in the United States. The case, one of Greene's first after being named to the bench, resulted in the 1982 consent decree between AT&T and the Federal Trade Commission. The consent decree, later amended and usually called the modified final judgment (MFJ), provided for the Bell System divestiture, AT&T's spin off of the seven Regional Bell Operating Companies (RBOCs). The conclusion of the case freed AT&T to enter the computer industry, from which it had previously been barred.

Greene presided over the 1990 trial of Admiral Poindexter. This was the first time that any former president (Reagan) testified about his own conduct in office in connection with a criminal trial.

In 1990, Greene sentenced the 1983 United States Senate bombing suspects, Laura Whitehorn and Linda Evans, to prison.

Death

Greene died from a cerebral hemorrhage on January 29, 2000, and was undergoing brain operations at the time. He had a wife, Evelyn, and two children: son Dr. Michael D. Greene and daughter Stephanie Cavagrotti. After his death, the George Washington University Law School created the Harold H. Greene Professor of Law endowed chair in his memory. The chair was established by an endowment gift of $1.5 million from telecommunications entrepreneurs David and Maria Wiegand of Orange County, California, owners of Pathfinder Communications at the time.

See also
 List of Jewish American jurists

References

1923 births
2000 deaths
Assistant United States Attorneys
Judges of the Superior Court of the District of Columbia
George Washington University Law School alumni
Jewish emigrants from Nazi Germany to the United States
Judges of the United States District Court for the District of Columbia
United States Army officers
United States district court judges appointed by Jimmy Carter
20th-century American judges
20th-century American lawyers